Bielsdown River, a perennial stream that is part of the Clarence River catchment, is located in the Northern Tablelands of New South Wales, Australia.

Course
Bielsdown River rises on the Dorrigo Plateau within the Great Dividing Range, below Fernbrook, west of Dorrigo, and flows generally to the north and northeast, joined by one minor tributary towards its confluence with Nymboida River, west of Cascade. The river descends  over its  course.

The falls are small but picturesque, and are a popular photographic subject.

See also 

 Rivers of New South Wales
 List of rivers of New South Wales (A–K)
 List of rivers of Australia

References 

 

Rivers of New South Wales
Northern Rivers